Guillermo Alejandro Suárez (born 9 June 1985 in Lincoln, Buenos Aires) is an Argentine footballer who currently plays for Coquimbo Unido as winger.

Career 
Suárez started his youth career with Deportivo Armenio in 2001. In 2002, he joined Rivadavia de Lincoln where he played until 2007.

Suárez joined Primera División side Club Atletico Tigre in 2007 and was part of the squad that achieved their highest ever league finish by claiming 2nd place in the Apertura 2007 tournament.

On July 3, 2008 he signed for Croatian champions GNK Dinamo Zagreb. He was then loaned back to Club Atletico Tigre for the calendar year of 2009 and then to Inter Zaprešić in 2010.

References

External links
 Argentine Primera statistics 
 Football-Lineups player profile
 Tigre player profile 
 

1985 births
Living people
People from Lincoln Partido
Argentine footballers
Argentine expatriate footballers
Association football forwards
Croatian Football League players
Club Atlético Tigre footballers
GNK Dinamo Zagreb players
NK Inter Zaprešić players
O'Higgins F.C. footballers
Coquimbo Unido footballers
Argentine Primera División players
Chilean Primera División players
Expatriate footballers in Croatia
Argentine expatriate sportspeople in Croatia
Expatriate footballers in Chile
Argentine expatriate sportspeople in Chile
Sportspeople from Buenos Aires Province